Suksdorfia violacea is an uncommon species of herbaceous flowering plant in the saxifrage family known by the common name violet suksdorfia. In 1879 Asa Gray named the genus Suksdorfia after Wilhelm Nikolaus Suksdorf who had first collected a specimen of S. violacea in 1878 near Mount Adams-White Salmon, Washington and sent it to Gray for assistance in classifying it. Gray and Suksdorf had a long and close working relationship, and Gray initially identified and named various species found by Suksdorf. Its conservation status has been rated by NatureServe as "G4 – Apparently Secure".

Taxonomy
Suksdorfia violacea is the type species for this genus and Gray named it after Suksdorf. The genus name Hemieva Raf. was published earlier than Suksdorfia, but was less well known, and Suksdorfia is now a conserved name. Therefore, Hemieva violacea, although correct when it was published in 1896 is no longer the correct name for this species.

Ecology
Suksdorfia violacea is found in Washington, British Columbia, Oregon, Alberta, Montana, and Idaho. It is most common in Washington and southeast British Columbia. It prefers moist areas with rocks, crevices, ledges, and fences. It is a perennial that grows from rhizomes. The calyx is a slender bell shape. The flower is a five-lobed, violet-colored, slender, tapered, and with 5 stamens.

References

Bibliography

External links

Saxifragaceae
Flora of the Northwestern United States
Flora of British Columbia
Flora without expected TNC conservation status